The Larceny (Advertisements) Act 1870 (33 & 34 Vict c 65) was an Act of the Parliament of the United Kingdom. According to its preamble, the purpose of this Act was to discourage vexatious proceedings, at the instance of common informers, against printers and publishers of newspapers, under section 102 of the Larceny Act 1861.

This Act was repealed by section 33(3) of, and Part II of Schedule 3 to, the Theft Act 1968.

This Act was retained for the Republic of Ireland by section 2(2)(a) of, and Part 4 of Schedule 1 to, the Statute Law Revision Act 2007.

Section 1 - Short title
This section authorised the citation of this Act, and the Larceny Act 1861, by their short titles, and by a collective title.

Section 2 - Definition of "newspaper"
This section read:

Section 3 - Limitation of actions for advertisements of reward for return of stolen property
This section read:

Section 4 - Stay of proceedings in action brought before the passing of this Act
This section was repealed by the Statute Law Revision Act 1883 (46 & 47 Vict c 39)

See also
Larceny Act

References
Halsbury's Statutes,
The Incorporated Council of Law Reporting. The Law Reports: The Public General Statutes, 1870. Pages 333 and 334.
Hansard,

External links
The Larceny (Advertisements) Act 1870, as originally enacted, from Google Books.
List of repeals and amendments in the Republic of Ireland from the Irish Statute Book

United Kingdom Acts of Parliament 1870